This a list of Australian equestrians across all disciplines.

B

 Kevin Bacon (1932–2020)
 Mervyn Bennet (born 1944)
 Emma Booth (born 1991)
 Grace Bowman (born 1990)
 Georgia Bruce (born 1981)
 Olivia Bunn (born 1979)
 Chris Burton (born 1981)

C

 Brien Cobcroft (1934–2010)

D

 Hannah Dodd (born 1992)
 Phillip Dutton (born 1963)

F

 Rosalie Fahey
 Joann Formosa (born 1961)
 Clayton Fredericks (born 1967)
 Lucinda Fredericks (born 1965)

G

 David Green (born 1960)
 Sam Griffiths (born 1972)

H

 Mary Hanna (born 1954)
 Julia Hargreaves (born 1986)
 Sue Hearn (born 1956)
 Julie Higgins (born 1958)
 Marita Hird (born 1971)
 Andrew Hoy (born 1959)

J

 Sharon Jarvis (born 1978)
 Vaughn Jefferis (born 1961)
 Sonja Johnson (born 1967)
 Megan Jones (born 1976)

K

 Scott Keach (born 1965)
 Nicole Kullen (1980–2018)

L

 Neale Lavis (1930–2019)
 Kelly Layne (born 1975)
 Laurie Lever (born 1947)
 Sue-Ellen Lovett (born 1959)

M

 Lisa Martin (born 1972)
 Lawrence Morgan (1915–1997)
 Rebel Morrow (born 1977)

O

 Rob Oakley (born 1962)
 Kristy Oatley (born 1978)
 Lyndal Oatley (born 1980)

P

 James Paterson-Robinson (born 1978)
 Denis Pigott (born 1946)
 Jan Pike (born 1952)

R

 Gillian Rolton (1956–2017)
 Shane Rose (born 1973)
 Bill Roycroft (1915–2011)
 Vicki Roycroft (born 1953)
 Wayne Roycroft (born 1946)
 Heath Ryan (born 1958)
 Matthew Ryan (born 1964)

S

 Wendy Schaeffer (born 1974)
 Janine Shepherd (born 1962)
 Anne Skinner (born 1954)
 Wayne Slattery (born 1970)

T

 Bunty Thompson (1925–2017)
 Stuart Tinney (born 1964)
 Maree Tomkinson (born 1968)
 Edwina Tops-Alexander (born 1974)

U

 Katie Umback (born 1973)
 Art Uytendaal (born 1931)

W

 Meg Wade (born 1961)
 Matt Williams (born 1985)
 May Wirth (1894–1978)

References

 
Equestrians